Arno Atoll is a coral atoll of 133 islands in the Pacific Ocean, and forms a legislative district of the Ratak Chain of the Marshall Islands. Its total land area is only . Unlike most other atolls, Arno encloses three different lagoons, a large central one, and two smaller ones in the north and east. At a distance of only , it is the closest atoll to the Marshall Islands capital, Majuro Atoll, and can be seen looking east from Majuro on a clear day at low tide. The population of Arno Atoll was 1,794 at the 2011 census. The most populous islets are Ajeltokrok, Kobjeltak, Rearlaplap, Langor and Tutu. The largest village is Ine, Arno.

People of Arno are well known for their productivity in making copra (the dried out meat of coconuts, from which coconut oil is extracted). Arno women are renowned for their production of the Kili Bag, a popular handwoven handbag/purse, named after another island in the Marshall Islands (to which the people of Bikini were eventually relocated as a result of the US nuclear tests that were conducted on their home atoll). Arno supposedly had a traditional "love school".

History
Arno Atoll was claimed by the Empire of Germany along with the rest of the Marshall Islands in 1884. After World War I, the island came under the South Seas Mandate of the Empire of Japan. Following the end of World War II, Arno Atoll came under the control of the United States as part of the Trust Territory of the Pacific Islands. The island has been part of the independent Republic of the Marshall Islands since 1986.

Education
Marshall Islands Public School System operates public schools:
 Arno Elementary School
 Bikarej Elementary School
 Ine Elementary School
 Jabo Elementary School
 Kilange Elementary School
 Longar Elementary School
 Lukoj Elementary School
 Matolen Elementary School
 Tinak Elementary School
 Tutu Elementary School
 Ulien Elementary School

Marshall Islands High School on Majuro serves the community.

References

External links
Marshall Islands site

 
Atolls of the Marshall Islands
Ratak Chain